The Hastings Contemporary is a museum of contemporary British art located on The Stade in Hastings, East Sussex and is a not-for-profit organisation. The gallery opened in March 2012 as the Jerwood Gallery and cost £4m to build. The gallery contains temporary exhibitions that included work from artists including L. S. Lowry, Augustus John, Stanley Spencer, Walter Sickert, Ben Nicholson, Patrick Caulfield, Maggi Hambling, Craigie Aitchison and Prunella Clough.

Architecture 
The building was designed by Hana Loftus and Tom Grieve (son of Alan Grieve, the chairman of the Jerwood Foundation) from the architecture firm HAT Projects. The outside of the gallery building is covered with over 8,000 black tiles that were glazed in Kent. In The Observer, the architecture critic Rowan Moore says that the Jerwood building "is not embarrassed by the stuff and clobber around it, and does not embarrass them". Moore concludes that the building is "a simple and straightforward place for viewing art".

Wallpaper described the gallery as "a perfectly formed, modest space, that doesn't try too hard".

The building was given a National Award in 2013 by the Royal Institute of British Architects.

Exhibitions 

The following artists have had exhibitions at Jerwood Gallery:

 Rose Wylie
 Gary Hume
 Gillian Ayres
 William Scott
 Philip Guston
 Basil Beattie
 Marlow Moss
 Christopher Wood
 Alfred Wallis
 Ansel Krut
 Quentin Blake
 Chantal Joffe

The gallery has also been a venue for an exhibition of art works from the Jerwood Drawing Prize in 2012.

Controversy and opposition 

The building of the gallery led to protests from local residents fearing that it would lead to gentrification of the surrounding area. In 2008, the Hastings Bonfire Society burned a model of the gallery in effigy. Keith Leech from the bonfire society said that the gallery represented "a long string of things that people are trying to foist upon us".

As the gallery replaced a coach park, opponents of the development believed it would reduce the amount of business from coach trip parties, while others believe it should have been located elsewhere in the town. Posters and banners opposing the development have been displayed nearby. Local residents pay a reduced rate to enter the gallery, and on the first Tuesday of every month the gallery is free to all between the hours of 4pm - 8pm.

Renaming 
In Summer 2019 the Jerwood Gallery cut ties with the Jerwood Foundation amid a funding dispute. As part of its separation, the gallery rebranded to be called Hastings Contemporary, though will remain in the building owned by the Jerwood Foundation.

The independent charity Hastings Contemporary is an Arts Council NPO receiving £100,000 per year grant from Arts Council England.

References

External links 
Hastings Contemporary website
Hastings Contemporary listing on Visit 1066 Country tourism site
 Save Our Stade – website of the anti-Jerwood campaigners

Contemporary art galleries in England
Buildings and structures in Hastings
Art museums and galleries in East Sussex